Robert James Frančević, (born on 18 September 1941 in Auckland, New Zealand) is a retired racing driver who featured prominently in New Zealand and Australia during the 1970s and 1980s. His biggest wins were the inaugural Wellington 500 street race in Wellington, New Zealand in 1985 driving a Volvo 240T, and the 1986 Australian Touring Car Championship, also in a 240T. Francevic's win in the 1986 ATCC was the first and only ATCC win by a non-Australian resident.

Career
Robbie Francevic started his motor racing career in 1966 when he and his team designed and built the "Colour Me Gone" Custaxie in which he won twenty races and the 1967 New Zealand Saloon Car Championship. During the 1970s Francevic was also a regular competitor in Formula 5000 racing, racing in the Tasman Series as well as the Rothmans International Series.

Robbie Francevic was the winner of the 1983 Benson & Hedges touring car series in NZ.

Following the 1985 Wellington 500, Francevic, while still living in Auckland, contested the 1985 Australian Touring Car Championship driving the Volvo 240T for owner and friend Mark Petch. Despite the speed he had shown in the NZ series, and that the Volvo's were winning races in the European Touring Car Championship, Francevic shocked the established stars Peter Brock, Dick Johnson and Jim Richards by winning the third round of the ATCC at Symmons Plains in Tasmania before going on to dominate the final round at Oran Park in Sydney. Other than Richards, Francevic was the only multiple race winner in the championship (Richards won 7, Francevic 2 and Brock one).

Following the ATCC, and on Francevic's suggestion, Mark Petch recruited 1984 and 1985 Australian Drivers' Champion John Bowe to partner Francevic in the 1985 Castrol 500 at Sandown in Melbourne. After a strong showing, the car finished its race with Bowe at the wheel at the entrance to the pits with a seized diff (the car was pushed into pitlane with a jack holding the rear tyres off the ground).

In 1986 Francevic became the first New Zealand resident to win the ATCC, becoming the second New Zealander (after Jim Richards in 1985) to win the series, and recording the only series win to date for Volvo. Francevic won the first two races of the season at Amaroo Park and Symmons Plains, finished second at Sandown to the Nissan Skyline of George Fury, and won again at Adelaide after runaway leader Peter Brock blew the engine in his Holden Commodore late in the race. This would prove to be his last win for the series and coincided with new team management, former Holden Dealer Team boss from the late 1970s John Shepherd was put in charge of the team following the sale of the team by Mark Petch Motorsport to Volvo Australia to form the Volvo Dealer Team. The Volvo was overtaken in speed by the Nissan turbo's and despite a newly built 240T appearing mid-season, Francevic was often slower than Bowe in qualifying but still scored enough points to win the championship from Fury by just five points.

Following the ATCC, Francevic wasn't happy with Shepherd's management of the team, nor was Shepherd happy with Francevic. Robbie was happy to have won the championship, but wanted to win from the front and driving for points like he was forced to over the latter part of the championship didn't suit his flamboyant, hard charging style. Tensions between Francevic and Shepherd came to a head at the 1986 Sandown 500. With the Volvo he was to drive with fellow Kiwi Graham McRae not having run in practice or qualifying due to the late build time, Francevic refused to race the car believing it (and the team's second car which was in the same situation) would not be competitive. While the John Bowe / Alfredo Costanzo Volvo failed to finish, its fastest race lap was identical to the winning Nissan Skyline of George Fury and Glenn Seton. Following his refusal to drive the car and his comments to the assembled media about the situation on the morning of the race, Francevic was fired from the Volvo Dealer Team on 15 September 1986, the day after the Sandown 500.

Bathurst 1000
At the 1985 Bathurst 1000, Francevic teamed with John Bowe in the Volvo and qualified fifth, his attempt at pole position in the Hardies Heroes top 10 run-off was thwarted by a flat tyre on his second run while trying to improve on his first run. With a very quick car and a strong diver pairing (Bowe, who like Francevic was on his first visit to Mount Panorama, was matching the Kiwi's times and it was only a late charge on qualifying tyres that saw Francevic post the quicker time), the pair considered one of the pre-race favourites along with the Tom Walkinshaw Racing Jaguar XJS', as it was thought the turbocharged Volvo was the only car capable of matching the speed of the V12 powered Jaguars. After a strong early showing in the race in which Francevic had held second for some time behind early leader Tom Walkinshaw, a failed alternator diode put them many laps down. The car finally retired on lap 122 when it ran out of fuel on the run up Mountain Straight.

After winning the 1986 ATCC and his much publicised falling out with the Volvo Dealer Team, Francevic drove Andy Rouse's former British Touring Car Championship (BTCC) winning Ford Sierra XR4Ti for former Volvo team owner Mark Petch to little success in the 1986 Bathurst 1000 with fellow Kiwi Leo Leonard, the car suffering terminal electrical problems on lap 26. Rather boldly, Francevic publicly predicted the turbo Ford would take pole position for the race, but the Kiwi pairing could only manage 21st on the grid with a time of 2:23.05 after a troubled practice and qualifying trying to get the car to run properly (despite the car being almost trouble free in pre-race testing). The time was 5.89 seconds behind the pole winning time set by Gary Scott's Nissan Skyline, and was 6.89 seconds slower than the Commodore of Allan Grice who set provisional pole time in qualifying. Francevic made his bold claim after the speed that the 2.3 litre turbocharged Sierras had shown in the FIA Touring Car Championship in Europe raced by Eggenberger Motorsport, and by the fact that Rouse had used the car to win the 1985 BTCC.

After sitting out most of 1987 without a drive, Francevic was drafted by Frank Gardner to co-drive the second of the JPS Team BMW's M3s at the Sandown 500 and Bathurst 1000, which (Bathurst) for 1987 had become a round of the World Touring Car Championship. Driving with the team's engine builder come driver Ludwig Finaur, Francevic finished fifth at Sandown before going on to his best ever Bathurst finish with sixth outright and second in class. During the race rain storms that hit late at Bathurst, Francevic, unable to see through a fogged up windscreen, accidentally ran over a pit lane marshal when coming into the pits, thankfully without any injury reported. The marshal wrote an official complaint to the race stewards over the incident, but due to the circumstances no action was taken.

For 1988, Francevic and long time backer Mark Petch secured a Ford Sierra RS500 from Walter Wolf Racing in West Germany to run in the 1988 Australian Touring Car Championship, but only started one race (Round 3 at Winton) and was excluded before practice of Round 5 in Adelaide due to illegal build components on the Sierra and the championship run was abandoned in the effort to get the car right (Wolf racing had built the Sierra to European Touring Car Championship (ETCC) standards which allegedly included a more liberal interpretation of the Group A rules than the Confederation of Australian Motor Sport (CAMS) allowed in Australia). At the time Francevic claimed that CAMS were trying to drum him out of the championship and that his sponsorship deals were only valid if he raced. As a result of not racing, the team lost its major sponsor and another needed to be found. The team then fronted with a new Sierra, and a new major sponsor in New Zealand confectionery company Whittaker's was found in time for the 1988 Bathurst 1000 where he teamed with Wolf Racing's lead driver and 1985 Bathurst winner Armin Hahne. Two engine failures in practice saw them only qualify 14th while overheating finished their race on lap 103 after running strongly in the top 3 for over 70 laps.

After a couple of shake down runs in the Sierra during the 1989 ATCC, Francevic then teamed with 1985 ETCC champion Gianfranco Brancatelli in the Petch owned Sierra in the 1989 Bathurst 1000. The car was qualified 15th, but Francevic didn't get a drive after the right front wheel fell off the car under Brancatelli on lap 14 when going across the top of the Mountain. Having to drive the car back to the pits for over half a lap resulted in too much damage being done to the car's axle and front suspension. His last start at Mount Panorama was in 1990 with fellow Kiwi racer Andrew Bagnall in Bagnall's Sierra RS500. Bagnall qualified the car 17th and the pair drove well all day to finish seventh outright in a race in which many of the more fancied big budget teams failed to finish or ran into problems which put them well out of contention.

Accolades
Robbie Francevic was an inaugural member of the MotorSport New Zealand Wall of Fame in 1994.

Career results

Complete Australian Touring Car Championship results
(key) (Races in bold indicate pole position) (Races in italics indicate fastest lap)

Complete World Touring Car Championship results
(key) (Races in bold indicate pole position) (Races in italics indicate fastest lap)

† Not eligible for series points

Complete Bathurst 1000 results

External links
New Zealand Wall of Fame 

Australian Touring Car Championship drivers
Living people
New Zealand people of Croatian descent
New Zealand racing drivers
Tasman Series drivers
Sportspeople from Auckland
1941 births
Australian Endurance Championship drivers